St Vincent Squadron was the name of a squadron used at the Britannia Royal Naval College (Dartmouth). Another squadron was Cunningham, and previously there was a Tiger squadron. The squadrons are used to split the students administratively and to and encourage a strong rivalry.

Divisions 

The squadron was split further into divisions, usually with three divisions in each intake (currently six per year including three in the opposing Cunningham Squadron). These divisions are named Somerset, St Albans, Sutherland, Diamond, Dragon, Defender, Ocean, Illustrious and Dauntless. Ark Royal, the flight division, is also affiliated to the squadron for administrative purposes, although each member remains within the squadron they joined in Phase 1. Wave Ruler, the RFA intake, is also part of the squadron for their time at BRNC.

Squadrons have now been removed, with the college being broken into 6 main divisions (St Vincent, Cunningham, Blake, Drake, Howe and Hawke) for Direct Graduate Entry, Non Graduate Entry, Upper Yardsman and foreign Officer Cadets, with additional divisions for other cadets in the college (e.g. Shackleton for RFA cadets).

John Jervis 

The squadron is named after John Jervis, 1st Earl of St Vincent in recognition for his Naval Accomplishments, most notably becoming First Lord of the Admiralty in 1801.

The Goldfish 

The squadron has two mascot goldfish that live outside of the VSO's office above the Junior Gun Room.

Military training establishments of the United Kingdom
Training establishments of the Royal Navy